"Higher Ground" is a song recorded by Dutch DJ and producer Martin Garrix, featuring Swedish singer and songwriter John Martin. The song was released on the former's birthday, 14 May 2020.

Background
Garrix played it during his live stream from his home in Amsterdam. ‘Higher Ground’ described the story of going through hard times but finding your way back up and eventually feeling happy and alive again.

Music video
The video was uploaded on May 14, 2020, which was made with the help of fans from all over the world.

Charts

Weekly charts

Year-end charts

References

2020 songs
2020 singles
Martin Garrix songs
John Martin (singer) songs
Stmpd Rcrds singles
Songs written by Martin Garrix
Songs written by Albin Nedler
Songs written by Michel Zitron
Songs written by John Martin (singer)
Songs written by Kristoffer Fogelmark